Josef Ritter von Kurzböck, also Joseph von Kurzbeck (21 November 1736, Vienna, Habsburg monarchy – 18 November 1792, Vienna, Habsburg Empire), was an Austrian printer, bookseller, merchant, estate owner and writer and one of the most prolific, Serbian Cyrillic printers in the Austrian Empire.

Biography
In 1755, he took over from his father the university book printing shop that had two presses and in the next few years he acquired 15 presses with a capacity to print books in Illyrian (Serbian Cyrillic) and Oriental languages.
In recognition of his typographic achievements, he was granted permission to build a university bookstore. Kurzböck continued his technical improvements in letter casting and letterpress printing, making the privately-protected book printer with efficient equipment and fair prices to successfully compete against Johann von Trattner (1717-1798) the Court Printer. His letterpress products were among the finest in the Holy Roman Empire as Austria and Hungary were then known. Empress Maria Theresa ennobled Kurzböck for his great merits in 1776. He translated several writings from Italian and published in 1779 an augmented and improved edition of the 1766 published "Almanac de Vienne en faveur des éstrangers" in German and French.

In 1792 after von Kurzböck died, the Serbian (Illyrian) printing house was sold to Stefan von Novaković and the Oriental press was sold to Anton Schmid (1765-1855).

See also
 Emanuilo Janković
 Damjan Kaulić
 Stefan von Novaković

References 

1736 births
1792 deaths
Austrian printers
Austrian booksellers
18th-century Austrian writers
Austrian translators
18th-century printers
Writers from Vienna
18th-century translators